Hans Peter L'Orange (2 March 1903 – 5 December 1983) was a Norwegian art historian and classical archaeologist.

Biography
L'Orange was born in Kristiania (now Oslo), Norway. He was a son of Major General Hans Wilhelm L'Orange (1868–1950) and Ginni Gulbranson (1879–1949). His family had its origin from among the  French Huguenots. He was a paternal grandson of military officer Hans Peter L'Orange  (1835–1907), maternal grandson of businessowner Carl August Gulbranson (1831–1910) and brother-in-law of  journalist and writer, Gunnar Larsen (1900–1958).

From 1930 to 1936 he was a university fellow resident in Rome. He  studied art history at the University of Munich. He took the dr.philos. degree at the University of Oslo in 1933  with his thesis Studien zur Geschichte des spätantiken Porträts. He was a professor of classical archaeology at the University of Oslo from 1942 to 1973.

In 1959 he and professor Hjalmar Torpe established the Norwegian Institute in Rome (Det norske institutt i Roma) as an affiliate of the University of Oslo. The institute established a permanent Norwegian base for research and studies of the Mediterranean countries.  He was director of the institute until he retired in 1973.

He was a visiting professor at Harvard University (1950) and at Johns Hopkins University (1966–1967). In 1969 he was awarded the Arts Council Norway Honorary Award (Norsk kulturråds ærespris). He was awarded the Gunnerus Medal  by the Royal Norwegian Society of Sciences and Letters in 1970.

Selected works
Apotheosis in Ancient Portraiture - 1947 
Keiseren på himmeltronen - 1949 
Romersk idyll - 1952 
Mot middelalder  -  1963 
Romerske keisere i marmor og bronse-  1967 
Sentrum og periferi. Ni utvalgte essays - 1973

References

1903 births
1983 deaths
Writers from Oslo
Norwegian art historians
Archaeologists from Oslo
Norwegian people of French descent
Ludwig Maximilian University of Munich alumni
University of Oslo alumni
Academic staff of the University of Oslo
20th-century Norwegian writers
20th-century archaeologists